John Dobbie (died 1952) was a popular Australian actor of theatre and film. He frequently appeared alongside George Wallace and had worked for a time in America.

Select credits
Jewelled Nights (1925)
His Royal Highness (1932) 
Gone to the Dogs (1939)

References

Australian male actors
1952 deaths
Year of birth missing